Twenty Mile Creek or Twentymile Creek may refer to:

 Twenty Mile Creek (Georgia), a stream in Georgia
 Twentymile Creek (Lake Erie tributary), a stream in New York and Pennsylvania
 Twenty Mile Creek (Ontario), a stream in Canada